Leptostylus arciferus is a species of longhorn beetles of the subfamily Lamiinae. It was described by Gahan in 1892, and is known from Mexico.

References

Leptostylus
Beetles described in 1892